The 2001–02 Vysshaya Liga season was the 10th season of the Vysshaya Liga, the second level of ice hockey in Russia. 30 teams participated in the league, and HC CSKA Moscow and HC Sibir Novosibirsk were promoted to the Russian Superleague.

First round

Western Conference

Eastern Conference

Final round

External links 
 Season on hockeyarchives.info
 Season on hockeyarchives.ru

Russian Major League seasons
2001–02 in Russian ice hockey leagues
Rus